Simon Lillistone (born 13 February 1969) is a male British former cyclist.

Cycling career
He competed at the 1988 Summer Olympics and the 1992 Summer Olympics.

He represented England in the scratch race and won a bronze medal in the 4,000 metres team pursuit, at the 1990 Commonwealth Games in Auckland, New Zealand. Four years later at the 1994 Commonwealth Games in Victoria, British Columbia, Canada he won a silver medal in the team time trial and competed in the scratch race and points race.

References

External links
 

1969 births
Living people
British male cyclists
Olympic cyclists of Great Britain
Cyclists at the 1988 Summer Olympics
Cyclists at the 1992 Summer Olympics
Sportspeople from Shrewsbury
Commonwealth Games medallists in cycling
Commonwealth Games silver medallists for England
Commonwealth Games bronze medallists for England
Cyclists at the 1990 Commonwealth Games
Cyclists at the 1994 Commonwealth Games
Medallists at the 1990 Commonwealth Games
Medallists at the 1994 Commonwealth Games